Baltalı (also, Baltaly) is a village and municipality in the Shaki Rayon of Azerbaijan.  It has a population of 1,900.

References 

Populated places in Shaki District